Mount Aduadu is the second highest mountain in Ghana, standing at an elevation of c. . The mountain is located in the Agumatsa Range near the villages of Gblede, Liati Wote and Wli, in the Volta Region of Ghana at the border with Togo.

References

Aduadu
Volta Region